The Katzarah Dam is a proposed dam located near Shyok, Shigar River, and Indus rivers in Pakistan.  If built it would be Pakistans largest dam.

Site
The dam site is about 18 km downstream of Skardu, Pakistan and would create storage in three gorges.

Storage and power
Katzarah dam would create a reservoir up to 35 maf, the largest in Pakistan and six times larger than Kalabagh or Basha. The largest reservoir is Kariba Dam lake which is 150 maf. It would be able to generate about 15,000 MW of power.

History

WAPDA Engineer Fateh Ullah discovered the dam site in 1957 by looking at the GTS maps later on he prepared a pre-feasibility report in April 1962. President Muhammad Ayub Khan requested the World Bank to send its experts to identify dam sites in Pakistan and other water resources projects. In 1968, Dr Pieter Lieftnick of the World Bank and his team identified Katzarah dam site near Skardu among others and called it Skardu dam.
Confusion is being created by calling Katzarah as Skardu, the two different dam sites namely Katzarah and Skardu are 22 km apart. Therefore, both cannot be called Skardu. The World Bank Team fixes the site for Skardu Dam on the upstream of Skardu town. It is immediately located on the downstream of the confluence of Shigar River with Indus River where a gauge site has since been established for the purpose. At this location the height of Skardu Dam is fixed as 310 feet, length 3700 feet and storage capacity as 8 maf. For confirmation reference may be made to Dr Pieter Lieftnick's report — pages 283 and 296.

References

Dams in Pakistan
Dams in the Indus River basin